Murjan (also Romanized as Mūrjan) is a village in Vahdat Rural District, Mugarmun District, Landeh County, Kohgiluyeh and Boyer-Ahmad Province, Iran. At the 2006 census, its population was 88, in 16 families.

References 

Populated places in Landeh County